Două anotimpuri (Two seasons) is the sixth album by DJ Project, released on June 22, 2007. Două anotimpuri (Two seasons) made a hit by selling over 10,000 copies.

The album perfectly combines two feelings, optimism and melancholy. As always, the band has successfully made another Hit album, and with new records, the song "Două anotimpuri"(Two Seasons) is the Top 1 in the Nielsen rankings, his ranking monitors the broadcasts numbers of the radios and the TVs, at a national level.

The first single from the album of the same name, "Două anotimpuri" (Two Seasons) has accumulated 30,672 points at a thousand points difference to the next classic piece, "Big Girls Do not Cry" – Fergie, being the most broadcast song in Romania and undoubtedly the hit of the summer that has just ended. Although the song is different from what the band has released so far, the audience was captured, like always, with the voice of Ellie White and the musical personality of DJ Gino Manzotti and Maxx, who clearly made their mark on the new album.

Track listing

Charts

References

External links
 Discogs, DJ Project – Două Anotimpuri
 Official Site of DJ Project

2007 albums
DJ Project albums